X-Men is an American superhero film series based on the Marvel Comics superhero team of the same name. 20th Century Fox obtained the film rights to the team and other related characters in 1994 for $2,600,000. After numerous drafts, Bryan Singer was hired to direct the first film, released in 2000, and its sequel, X2 (2003), while the third installment of the original trilogy, X-Men: The Last Stand (2006), was directed by Brett Ratner.

After each film outgrossed its predecessor, several spin-off films were released, including three Wolverine films (2009–2017), four X-Men prequel films (2011–2019), two Deadpool films (2016–2018), and two television seriesLegion (2017–2019) and The Gifted (2017–2019)with the stand-alone The New Mutants concluding the series in 2020 after a 20-year-long run.

With thirteen films released, the X-Men film series is the ninth-highest-grossing film series, having grossed over $6billion worldwide.

In March 2019, Marvel Studios regained the film rights to the X-Men, along with the Fantastic Four and Deadpool, after Disney acquired Fox for $71.3 billion; they are planned to be integrated into the Marvel Cinematic Universe (MCU). In October 2020, the films in the X-Men series, along with the Fantastic Four films, were rebranded as Marvel Legacy films on Disney+.

Patrick Stewart later reprised his role as Charles Xavier / Professor X from the series in Doctor Strange in the Multiverse of Madness (2022). Deadpool 3 (2024), a sequel to the X-Men film Deadpool 2 (2018), will integrate the series' iterations of Wade Wilson / Deadpool and Wolverine into the continuity of the MCU, respectively reprised by Ryan Reynolds and Hugh Jackman.

Films

X-Men original trilogy (2000–2006)

X-Men (2000)

The film introduces Logan and Rogue into the conflict between Professor Xavier's X-Men and the Brotherhood of Mutants, led by Magneto. Magneto intends to mutate world leaders at a United Nations summit with a machine he has built to bring about acceptance of mutantkind, but he was not aware that this forced mutation will result only in their deaths.

In 1994, 20th Century Fox and producer Lauren Shuler Donner bought the film rights to the X-Men. Andrew Kevin Walker was hired to write, and James Cameron expressed interest in producing. Eventually, Bryan Singer signed on to direct in July 1996. Although he was not a comic book fan, Singer was fascinated by the analogies of prejudice and discrimination that X-Men offered. John Logan, Joss Whedon, Ed Solomon, Christopher McQuarrie, and David Hayter wrote the script, with Hayter receiving sole credit. Principal photography began in September 1999 in Toronto, Canada, and ended in March 2000. The film was released on July 14, 2000.

X2 (2003)

Colonel William Stryker brainwashes and questions the imprisoned Magneto about Professor Xavier's mutant-locating machine, Cerebro. Stryker attacks the X-Mansion and brainwashes Xavier into locating every mutant on the planet to kill them. The X-Men must team up with the Brotherhood to prevent Stryker's worldwide genocide.

Hayter and Zak Penn were hired to write their own scripts for the sequel, which Singer would pick, with an aim to release the film in December 2002. Michael Dougherty and Dan Harris were hired to re-write the script in February 2002, writing around 26 drafts and 150 on set. Principal photography began in June 2002 in Vancouver, Canada, and ended in November 2002. The film was released on May 2, 2003.

X-Men: The Last Stand (2006)

A pharmaceutical company has developed a "cure" that suppresses the mutant gene, provoking controversy in the mutant community. Magneto declares war on the humans and retrieves his own weapon: Phoenix, the resurrected former X-Men member Jean Grey. A final battle between the X-Men and the Brotherhood ensues, and Wolverine must accept that in order to stop Grey, he will have to kill her.

Joss Whedon's Astonishing X-Men story "Gifted", featuring a mutant cure, was suggested for the primary story. Matthew Vaughn came on board as director in February 2005 but left due to the rushed production schedule. Brett Ratner was later hired as director in June. Principal photography began in August 2005 in Vancouver, Canada, and ended in January 2006. The film was released on May 26, 2006.

Wolverine trilogy (2009–2017)

X-Men Origins: Wolverine (2009)

A prequel and a spin-off focusing on the character Wolverine and his relationship with his half-brother Victor Creed, as well as his time with Stryker's Team X, before, and shortly after his skeleton was bonded with the indestructible metal, adamantium.

David Benioff was hired to write the screenplay for the spin-off film Wolverine in October 2004. Hugh Jackman became producer as well as star and worked with Benioff on the script. There were negotiations with the studio for Ratner to take the helm of the film after directing X-Men: The Last Stand, but no agreement was made. In July 2007, Gavin Hood was hired as director. Principal photography began in January 2008 in Queenstown, New Zealand, and ended in May. The film was released on May 1, 2009.

The Wolverine (2013)

Set after the events of X-Men: The Last Stand, the film features Wolverine heading to Japan for a reunion with a soldier named Ichiro Yashida whose life he saved years before. Wolverine must defend the man's granddaughter Mariko Yashida from all manner of ninja and Yakuza assassins.

Christopher McQuarrie, who went uncredited for his work on X-Men, was hired to write the screenplay in August 2009. Darren Aronofsky was chosen to direct the film but bowed out, stating the project would keep him out of the country for too long. James Mangold was later hired to direct the film. Mark Bomback was then hired to rewrite McQuarrie's script. Principal photography began in August 2012 in Sydney, Australia, and ended in November. The film was released on July 26, 2013.

Logan (2017)

In 2029, Logan and Charles Xavier meet a young girl named Laura, a test-tube daughter of Wolverine, who is being hunted by the Reavers led by Donald Pierce.

By November 2013, 20th Century Fox had begun negotiations for the treatment for a third Wolverine solo film with director James Mangold and Donner attached to produce. Mangold said that it would be inspired by other Wolverine stories from the comic books and it would be made after X-Men: Apocalypse. In March 2014, David James Kelly was hired to write the script. In April 2015, Michael Green was hired to work on the film's script. Principal photography commenced in May 2016 in New Orleans, Louisiana, and concluded in August 2016. The film was released on March 3, 2017, and marked both Hugh Jackman and Patrick Stewart's final run as Wolverine and Xavier, respectively.

X-Men prequel films (2011–2019)

X-Men: First Class (2011)

Set primarily in 1962 during the Cuban Missile Crisis, the film focuses on the origins of, and relationship between Charles Xavier / Professor X and Erik Lehnsherr / Magneto and their respective teams of mutants, the X-Men and the Brotherhood.

Producer Lauren Shuler Donner first thought of a prequel based on the young X-Men during the production of X2, and later producer Kinberg suggested to 20th Century Fox an adaptation of the comic-book series X-Men: First Class. Singer signed on to direct the film in December 2009; however, in March 2010 it was announced that Singer would only be producing. Vaughn, who was previously attached to direct X-Men: The Last Stand, became the director and co-wrote the final script with his writing partner, Jane Goldman. The film superseded a planned X-Men Origins: Magneto film, and the Writers Guild of America arbitration credited Magneto writer Sheldon Turner for the film's story. Principal photography began in August 2010 in London, England, and ended in December. The film was released on June 3, 2011.

X-Men: Days of Future Past (2014)

Set years after the events of The Wolverine, the film features the cast of the original X-Men trilogy and X-Men: First Class. The story, inspired by Chris Claremont and John Byrne's The Uncanny X-Men comic book storyline "Days of Future Past", features Wolverine going back in time to 1973 to prevent an assassination that, if carried out, will lead to the creation of a new weapons system called the Sentinels that threatens the existence of mutants—and, potentially, all of humanity.

Matthew Vaughn was attached to direct the film but left in October 2012 to focus on the film Kingsman: The Secret Service. Singer, who directed the first two X-Men films and produced X-Men: First Class, became the director of the film. The screenplay was written by Kinberg. Principal photography began in April 2013 in Montreal, Canada, and ended in August. Additional filming took place in Montreal in November 2013 and February 2014. The film was released on May 23, 2014.

X-Men: Apocalypse (2016)

Set a decade after X-Men: Days of Future Past, En Sabah Nur, the first mutant, awakens after thousands of years. Disillusioned with the world as he finds it, he recruits a team of mutants to cleanse mankind and create a new world order, over which he will reign. Raven, with the help of Professor X, must lead the X-Men to stop En Sabah Nur and save mankind from destruction.

In December 2013, Singer announced the upcoming X-Men film, titled X-Men: Apocalypse, a sequel to X-Men: Days of Future Past. Directed by Singer from a script by Simon Kinberg, Dan Harris and Michael Dougherty, the film was said to focus on the origin of the mutants. Kinberg said that it would take place in 1983 and complete a trilogy that began with X-Men: First Class. Principal photography began in April 2015 in Montreal, Canada, and ended in August. Additional filming took place in January 2016. The film was released on May 27, 2016, in North America.

Dark Phoenix (2019)

Set nine years after the events of X-Men: Apocalypse, the X-Men are superheroes going on increasingly risky missions. When a solar flare hits Jean Grey during a rescue mission in space, she loses control of her abilities and unleashes the Phoenix.

The film was announced in February 2017, with Kinberg confirmed to write and direct in June of the same year. Principal photography commenced in June 2017 in Montreal, Canada and ended in October of the same year. Additional filming occurred in August and September 2018. The film was released on June 7, 2019.

Deadpool films (2016–2018)

Deadpool (2016)

Mercenary and former Special Forces operative Wade Wilson is subjected to an experiment that leaves him with new abilities. He adopts the alter ego Deadpool to hunt down the man who nearly destroyed his life.

In May 2000, Marvel Studios attempted to produce a Deadpool film as part of a distribution deal with Artisan Entertainment. However, by 2004, Marvel was developing the film with New Line Cinema. David S. Goyer was set to write and direct and courted actor Ryan Reynolds for the lead role, but lost interest within months in favor of other projects. 20th Century Fox acquired Deadpool the following year after New Line Cinema placed it in turnaround and was considering the spin-off in the development of X-Men Origins: Wolverine, with Reynolds being cast for the role. After the opening weekend success of X-Men Origins: Wolverine in May 2009, Fox lent Deadpool out to writers with Donner acting as a producer. Rhett Reese and Paul Wernick were hired to write the script in January 2010. Robert Rodriguez was sent a draft of the screenplay the following June but did not pursue it, and Adam Berg emerged as a top contender to direct. In April 2011, visual effects specialist Tim Miller was hired to direct. Principal photography began in March 2015 in Vancouver, Canada, and ended in May. The film was released on February 12, 2016.

Deadpool 2 (2018)

After a personal tragedy, Deadpool creates the X-Force to save a young mutant from the time-traveling soldier Cable.

In September 2015, Kinberg said that a sequel for Deadpool was in development. By the release of Deadpool, 20th Century Fox greenlit the film, with Rhett Reese and Paul Wernick returning to write, and Miller being looked at to return as director, as he was working on the script at the time. However, in October 2016, Miller left the film due to creative differences with Reynolds and was replaced by David Leitch in November as the director. In February 2017, Drew Goddard had joined as a creative consultant to work on the script with Reynolds, Rhett Reese and Paul Wernick. Filming commenced in June 2017 in Vancouver, Canada and concluded in October. The film was released on May 18, 2018.

The New Mutants (2020)

Five mutants are discovering their abilities while held in a secret facility against their will. They will fight to escape their past sins to save themselves.

In May 2015, Josh Boone was hired to direct and write a film adaptation of The New Mutants comic-book series. Acting as a spin-off to the X-Men films, it is co-written by Knate Gwaltney, Scott Neustadter and Michael H. Weber with Donner and Kinberg producing. Filming commenced in July 2017 in Boston, Massachusetts. The film was released on August 28, 2020, after facing several delays.

Television

Legion (2017–2019)

After completing work on the first season of Fargo at FX in 2014, Noah Hawley was presented with the opportunity to develop the first live-action television series based on the X-Men comics, of which he was a fan when growing up. Hawley was initially pitched two different ideas for the potential series, including an adaptation of the comics' Hellfire Club, but the ideas did not interest Hawley. Instead, he worked with X-Men film series writer and producer Simon Kinberg to reverse-engineer an idea for the series, set in alternate continuity to that of the film series. After discussing an "interesting show in this genre ... that isn't being done", the two settled on the character of David Haller / Legion. Hawley found the character interesting because of his mental illness, and for the potential of the series to depict his unique mindset. He pitched the series as "a deconstruction of a villain ... and a love story".

In October 2015, FX ordered a pilot for Legion, with Marvel Television and FX Productions producing; FX Productions would handle the physical production. Hawley was set to write the pilot, and executive produce the series alongside X-Men film producers Lauren Shuler Donner, Bryan Singer, and Kinberg, Marvel Television executives Jeph Loeb and Jim Chory, and Hawley's Fargo collaborator John Cameron. Steve Blackman, Alan Fine, Stan Lee, Joe Quesada, and Karim Zreik also executive produce. Hawley's initial script for the series was described as "less fractured", "cohesive [and] much more regular." However, he quickly reconceived the series "and decided more Eternal Sunshine of the Spotless Mind, Terrence Malick, more whimsy, more impressionistic and went in that direction." By January 2016, FX President John Landgraf was confident that the series would be picked up by the network, saying that "the vast majority of things that we pilot do go forward to series" and "the scripts [for Legion] are extraordinary." That May, FX ordered an eight-episode first season of Legion, starring Dan Stevens as the title character, alongside Rachel Keller, Aubrey Plaza, Jean Smart, Jeremie Harris, Amber Midthunder, Katie Aselton, Bill Irwin, Jemaine Clement, and Hamish Linklater, with Navid Negahban and Lauren Tsai respectively joining the cast in the second and third seasons.

In January 2016, Landgraf stated that the series would be set in a universe parallel to the X-Men films where "the US government is in the early days of being aware that something called mutants exist but the public is not". He felt it was unlikely that characters would cross over between the show and films, but noted that this could change between then and the premiere of the series. In August, Singer confirmed that Legion had actually been designed to fit into the X-Men film series universe, but also to stand alone, so "you wouldn't have to label" the relationship between the series and the films. He teased plans to have the series "relate to future X-Men movies". At New York Comic-Con 2016, Donner said that the series is "far from the X-Men movies, but still "lives in that universe." The only way for X-Men to keep moving forward is to be original and to surprise. And this is a surprise. It is very, very different." Hawley explained that because the series is depicting the title character's "subjective reality", it would not have to address any connections to the films straight away, noting that Fargo, which is connected to the 1996 film of the same name, at first "had to stand on its own feet" before exploring its explicit continuity connections more; "We have to earn the right to be part of this universe. My hope is we create something so strong that the people in the movie studio call and say they would be foolish enough not to connect these things." He did state that "you can't tell this story without" acknowledging that Legion is the son of the same incarnation of Charles Xavier who appears in the films (portrayed by Patrick Stewart and James McAvoy).

Donner stated in January 2017 that having Hawley focus on Haller's perspective of reality rather than connections to the X-Men films allowed the series to avoid the convoluted continuity of the films, "because we play with so many different timelines, and we rebooted and not really rebooted and all that" throughout the films. Therefore, "the cinematic universe will not worry about Legion." For the onscreen confirmation that Xavier is Haller's father in "Chapter 7", with Xavier's signature wheelchair shown in a brief flashback, the series' production was able to choose from any of the variant wheelchairs used throughout the film series. They settled on the version from X-Men: Apocalypse, with the prop used in that film being brought out of storage for the show. In March 2017, Patrick Stewart was approached about reprising his role as Xavier from the film series in the series' third season, saying he was "Absolutely 100%" willing to reprise the role; while having Stewart return as a present-day Xavier had been "seriously considered" by showrunner Noah Hawley, he elected the older character's presence to be unnecessary upon deciding to have the season revolve around time travel, and, after finding James McAvoy to be unavailable for filming, cast Harry Lloyd as a young Xavier.

The Gifted (2017–2019)

In July 2016, after a series based on the Hellfire Club, an X-Men comic property, did not move forward at Fox, the network made a put pilot commitment for a different X-Men based series. The new pilot, written by Matt Nix, was for an action-adventure series based on ordinary parents discovering their children's mutant abilities. Fox Entertainment President David Madden said that "developing a Marvel property has been a top priority for the network—and we are so pleased with how Matt Nix has led us into this thrilling universe." The series is produced by 20th Century Fox Television and Marvel Television, with 20th handling the physical production of the series, and Nix executive producing alongside X-Men film series producers Bryan Singer, Lauren Shuler Donner, and Simon Kinberg, and Marvel Television executives Jeph Loeb and Jim Chory. Nix pitched the series to executives as "Running on Empty with mutants". He created an elaborate presentation using Prezi which included photos of preferred actors that he had altered to look like mutants, and graphics to explain how the series would fit in with the continuity of the X-Men films. On May 9, Fox ordered the show to series as The Gifted. The pilot had been called "one of the hottest pilots of the [2017] broadcast development season" by commentators. The first season consists of 13 episodes. In August, Len Wiseman joined as a director and executive producer for the season. That October, Nix said that he had planned "a couple of seasons, in broad strokes", and stated that he wanted "to be doing this show for a long time." Noting a growing trend in shorter, self-contained television seasons, Nix said that he wanted the show to feel more like a traditional, long-running story and so have each season end in a satisfying way that does not feel "close-ended".

On January 4, 2018, the series was renewed for a 16-episode second season. Described as being designed for "limited runs", Fox had not been in a hurry to give the series an early renewal before then. On April 17, 2019, it was announced that the series had been cancelled by Fox. In February 2017, Jamie Chung was cast as a younger incarnation of Clarice Fong, an original Asian incarnation of the Marvel Comics character Blink previously introduced in the 2014 X-Men film X-Men: Days of Future Past, portrayed by Fan Bingbing. Chung was then joined by Stephen Moyer, Sean Teale, Natalie Alyn Lind, Amy Acker, Percy Hynes White, Coby Bell, and Emma Dumont as Lorna Dane / Polaris, the daughter of the incarnation of Magneto portrayed by Ian McKellen and Michael Fassbender.

Timeline
The events of the films are separated into two "timelines"; the original timeline and the new timeline. The setting of Logan was initially implied by Hugh Jackman to be set in an alternate timeline and not following the prequel films, before director James Mangold stated that it was related; Marvel later officially classified the film as a separate universe from the film series in the Official Handbook of the Marvel Universe A-Z. Within the Marvel multiverse, the original timeline was officially designated as Earth-10005, the events of Deadpool 2 as Earth-41633, the events of Logan as Earth-17315, while the new timeline, consisting of the prequel films, Deadpool and The New Mutants remains undesignated.

Recurring characters

Reception

Box office performance
The first three X-Men films and Deadpool set opening records in North America: X-Men had the highest July opening yet, while X2 and X-Men: The Last Stand earned the fourth-highest opening weekends yet and Deadpool got the largest opening weekend in February. The records for the first three films have since been surpassed. The next three X-Men films after X-Men: The Last Stand opened lower than their predecessor and didn't set opening records. In North America, Deadpool is the highest-grossing film in the series, and it also has the highest opening weekend. Outside North America, X-Men: Days of Future Past has the highest opening weekend and is the highest-grossing film in the series. Worldwide, Deadpool was the highest-grossing film in the series and the highest-grossing R-rated film of all time, before being surpassed on both records by its sequel.

The X-Men film series is the second highest-grossing film series based on Marvel Comics characters after the Marvel Cinematic Universe (MCU). In North America, it is the fifth-highest-grossing film series, having earned over $2.4billion. Worldwide, it is the ninth-highest-grossing film series of all time, having grossed over $6billion.

Critical response
Wesley Morris of The Boston Globe praised the first three X-Men films as "more than a cash-guzzling wham-bang Hollywood franchise... these three movies sport philosophy, ideas, a telethon-load of causes, and a highly elastic us-versus-them allegory". Morris praised X-Men: The Last Stand for "put[ting] the heroes of a mighty summer blockbuster in a rare mortal position. Realism at this time of year? How unorthodox!" Roger Ebert gave the films mostly positive reviews but criticized them for the amount of mutants, stating "their powers are so various and ill-matched that it's hard to keep them all on the same canvas".

The first two films were highly praised due to their cerebral tone. However, when director Bryan Singer left the series, many criticized his successor, Brett Ratner. Colin Colvert of the Star Tribune felt "Singer's sensitivity to [the discrimination themes] made the first two X-Men films surprisingly resonant and soulful for comic-based summer extravaganzas... Singer is adept at juggling large casts of three-dimensional characters, Ratner makes shallow, unimaginative bang-ups." James Berardinelli felt, "X-Men: The Last Stand isn't as taut or satisfying as X-Men 2, but it's better constructed and better paced than the original X-Men. The differences in quality between the three are minor, however; despite the change in directors, there seems to be a single vision." David Denby of The New Yorker praised "the liquid beauty and the poetic fantasy of Singer's work", but called Ratner's film "a crude synthesizer of comedy and action tropes". Singer's third film in the series, X-Men: Days of Future Past, was also well received. Alonso Duralde of The Wrap felt that "Singer keeps things moving along briskly enough that you can just go along with the ride of Superhero Stuff without getting bogged down". Spider-Man director Sam Raimi said he was a fan of the series, particularly Singer's films. Film historian Kim Newman also tonally compared Batman Begins to Singer's films. Logan was nominated for the Academy Award for Best Adapted Screenplay.

There was criticism of the large casts and the limited screen time available for all of them. Richard George of IGN reacted well to the depictions of Wolverine, Professor X, Magneto, Jean Grey, Storm, William Stryker, Mystique, Beast and Nightcrawler; however, George thought many of the younger X-Men characters, such as Rogue, Iceman, Pyro, Angel and Kitty Pryde were "adjectiveless teenagers", and was disappointed by Cyclops' characterization. He observed the filmmakers were "big fans of silent henchmen", due to the small roles of the various villainous mutants; such as Lady Deathstrike and Psylocke. Jesse Schedeen of IGN stated that the continuity of the films does not make sense with dead characters returning with zero or little explanation, different versions of the same character appearing across multiple films, and plot points that are conveniently ignored in later films. He also criticized 20th Century Fox for not mapping out the series from the beginning. In his review of Dark Phoenix, Joe Morgenstern of The Wall Street Journal characterized the entire X-Men film series as being a "notoriously erratic franchise".

Legacy
Richard George of IGN stated that the success of the first X-Men film paved the way for comic-book film adaptations such as the Spider-Man series, Fantastic Four (2005), V for Vendetta and Singer's Superman Returns. Chris Hewitt of Empire magazine called the first X-Men film as the "catalyst" for films based on Marvel Comics characters, stating "Singer's 2000 film is the catalyst for everything that's come since, good and bad. Without it, there's no Marvel Studios." Comic-book writer Mark Millar said that Singer's X-Men "revolutionized" superhero films. Rebecca Rubin of Variety magazine stated that the X-Men franchise has proven there is an audience for a hardline superhero film, while Jeff Bock of Exhibitor Relations said that with films like the Deadpool films and Logan, the studios can do more with an R-rated film and give the audience something new. However, Tim Grierson and Will Leitch of New York magazine's Vulture criticized the series, noting that the best films of the series failed to capture the zeitgeist the way Marvel Cinematic Universe films did.

Music

Soundtracks

Home media

As of May 2014, the DVD and Blu-ray sales of the first six films in the United States earned more than $620million.

On April 26, 2021, Disney released a 10-movie collection titled X-Men: 10 Movie Collection, was released by 20th Century Studios Home Entertainment.

Canceled projects

In March 2019, The Walt Disney Company acquired the film and television rights for the X-Men after the acquisition deal of 21st Century Fox was completed. The films in development under 20th Century Fox were placed "on hold" and eventually canceled by Disney. Any future X-Men projects will be produced by Marvel Studios, and the characters will be integrated into the Marvel Cinematic Universe. Future films based on the X-Men franchise planned by Fox before the acquisition included:

 X4 and X5: In 2009, Lauren Shuler Donner pitched Bryan Singer on doing a sequel of the X-Men original trilogy. In March 2011, Shuler Donner revealed that sequels to X-Men: The Last Stand were in "active development at Fox," saying, "we took the treatment to Fox and they love it ... and X4 leads into X5".
 Untitled Fox–Marvel crossover film: In 2010, Zack Stentz and Ashley Edward Miller were to co-write an ensemble film featuring every Marvel Comics property whose film rights were owned by 20th Century Fox: The X-Men, the Fantastic Four, Daredevil and Deadpool. The plot revolved around a superhero registration act, pitting various characters on opposite sides of the conflict similar to the Civil War story arc. Paul Greengrass had been approached to serve as director, though scheduling conflicts placed the project indefinitely on hold. Warren Ellis worked separately on another draft of the script. Greengrass later stated that he was never contractually signed on to work on the project and that "in the end, nothing happened".
 X-Force: In July 2013, Jeff Wadlow was hired to write and potentially direct a film adaptation of the X-Men spin-off comic-book series X-Force. Mark Millar, the creative consultant for 20th Century Fox's Marvel Comics based films at the time, stated that the film would feature five characters as protagonists. After the release of Deadpool, Ryan Reynolds stated that Deadpool would appear in the film. By May 2016, Simon Kinberg was in the process of rewriting the script. In February 2017, Joe Carnahan had signed on as director, as well as a co-writer with Reynolds. By September of the same year, Drew Goddard was attached to write and direct. Rhett Reese said the film could be described as an R-rated take on the X-Men. Kinberg, Reynolds and Donner were later slated to serve as producers for the film. In September 2018, Kinberg said that Goddard would begin work on the script after the release of Bad Times at the El Royale.
 Gambit: In October 2014, Josh Zetumer was hired to write the screenplay for a film about the character Gambit, based on the treatment by comic-book writer Chris Claremont. In June 2015, Rupert Wyatt was then hired to direct but left in September due to schedule conflicts. In November, Doug Liman was in final negotiations to direct the film. Liman left the film in August 2016, to direct Justice League Dark. By October, Gore Verbinski had signed on as director, while Zetumer continued to work on the script. In January 2018, Verbinski departed the film due to scheduling issues. Kinberg stated that the film was intended to be the start of multiple installments focusing on Gambit, and that the final script had been completed by May 2018. By January 2019, Tatum was in early negotiations to direct the film. Tatum later revealed that he was hired to co-direct with Reid Carolin. By March, Kinberg was revealed to be co-screenwriter. The film was set to star Channing Tatum in the lead role with Donner, Kinberg, Tatum and Carolin attached as producers. In May 2019, the film was removed from 20th Century Fox's official release schedule. Tatum later revealed that the movie was delayed at various times, because the studio was pushing for an established filmmaker, and did not seem to have faith in he and Carolin's direction. Gambit had been a few months away from principal photography before it was cancelled by The Walt Disney Company. The co-directors later described the plot as "Goodfellas in New Orleans", similar in style to Deadpool, with elements of a romantic comedy.
 Untitled The New Mutants sequels: In December 2016, Boone stated that he had pitched the New Mutants-centered trilogy of films to 20th Century Fox with intentions for each film to build upon the last, as well as the X-Men film franchise as whole. In October 2017, he confirmed that the sequels had been greenlit by the studio. The first sequel was intended to introduce new characters joining the team, while each installment was planned to explore a different style within the horror genre. The sequel would have included the team traveling to Brazil to defeat the Hellfire Club, including Sunspot's villainous father Emmanuel da Costa; Antonio Banderas was cast in the role. The sub-genre was intended to be an alien horror film introducing Warlock and Xi'an Coy Manh / Karma to the team, with the plot involving an invasion story device. Sacha Baron Cohen had entered early negotiations to portray Warlock. A third film would've culminated the planned trilogy centered around the New Mutants characters. The story of the third entry was revealed to be an adaptation of the "Inferno" comic book story-arc, centering around Illyana Rasputin / Magik and her alternate reality persona as Darkchilde, in a supernatural-satanic horror film. The plot was intended to have involved a crossover element with the mainline X-Men movies.
 Alpha Flight and Exiles: In February 2017, Kinberg stated that Alpha Flight and the Exiles were characters being developed by the studio, for film adaptation.
 Laura: In February 2017, James Mangold stated that with the introduction of Laura Kinney / X-23 in Logan, there was a possibility that the character would appear in future films. Later that month, Kinberg said that a film centered around the character was in development. By October of the same year, Mangold and Craig Kyle had signed onto the project, now titled Laura, as co-screenwriters. 
 Multiple Man: In November 2017, a film centering around Jamie Madrox / Multiple Man was in development with James Franco starring in the lead role. Allan Heinberg was attached as screenwriter, with Kinberg and Franco as producers.
 Kitty Pryde: In January 2018, Tim Miller was announced to be directing a film centered around Kitty Pryde. In February 2018, Brian Michael Bendis was hired to write the script.
 Fox's Deadpool 3: In November 2016, plans began for a third Deadpool film. Rhett Reese and Paul Wernick stated the film would enter production after X-Force was completed, with Ryan Reynolds and Morena Baccarin scheduled to reprise their roles. Production was planned to take place in Atlanta, Georgia. Reynolds later revealed that the original plan for the plot, under 20th Century Fox's development, was written as a road trip film with Wade Wilson / Deadpool and James "Logan" Howlett / Wolverine. In his announcement, the actor implied that Jackman would have returned for the project. After the acquisition of 21st Century Fox by Disney was announced in December 2017 and completed in March 2019, Disney CEO Bob Iger said that Deadpool would be integrated with the MCU under Disney, with Reynolds expected to reprise his role. In December 2019, Reynolds confirmed that a third Deadpool film was in development, though it would be produced by Marvel Studios. In March 2022, filmmaker Shawn Levy was hired to direct the project and writers Rhett Reese and Paul Wernick returned from the previous two films, to write a revised screenplay based on a story penned by the Molyneux sisters. In September 2022, Hugh Jackman was revealed to be reprising his role as Wolverine in the film, appearing as a co-lead with Reynolds in a similar vein to the initial vision for the film at Fox. The film in its current iteration is scheduled to be released on November 8, 2024, as the first film in Phase Six of the MCU.

Notes

References 

 
Action film series
American film series
20th Century Studios franchises
Marvel Entertainment franchises
Science fiction film series
Film series introduced in 2000
Film series based on Marvel Comics